The Grabenbach Formation is a geologic formation in Austria. It preserves fossils dating back to the Santonian of the Cretaceous period.

See also 

 List of fossiliferous stratigraphic units in Austria

References

External links 
 

Geologic formations of Austria
Upper Cretaceous Series of Europe
Cretaceous Austria
Santonian Stage
Shale formations